Sekayam River is a river of Borneo, West Kalimantan province, Indonesia. It is a tributary of the Kapuas River.  The Public Forest System Utility Program (Program Pemberdayaan Sistem Hutan Kerakyatan; PPSHK) has a scheme on the river aimed at reducing the level of mercury content absorbed by humans.

Hydrology 
The river flows through the dense rainforest of Borneo. The Entabai River enters the Sekayam River.

Geography 
The river flows in the western area of Borneo island with predominantly tropical rainforest climate (designated as Af in the Köppen-Geiger climate classification). The annual average temperature in the area is 23 °C. The warmest month is August, when the average temperature is around 24 °C, and the coldest is November, at 20 °C. The average annual rainfall is 3680 mm. The wettest month is December, with an average of 466 mm rainfall, and the driest is June, with 181 mm rainfall.

Use 
During the 1880s the river was exploited for its Cinnabar and antimony in its far upper course.

See also
List of rivers of Indonesia
List of rivers of Kalimantan

References

Rivers of West Kalimantan
Rivers of Indonesia